Liam McCarthy may refer to:

Liam McCarthy (hurler) (born 1963), Irish retired hurler
Half of the duo of Liam McCarthy and John D. O'Callaghan, Irish school students who won a science award
 Liam MacCarthy (1853–1928), Gaelic Athletic Association patron

See also
 Liam MacCarthy Cup, for winning the All-Ireland Senior Hurling Championship